The Bongo Massif, also known as the Tondou Massif, is a mountain range in north-eastern Central African Republic, near the Sudan border. The source of Bahr al-Arab is found within the massif. South of the massif is the Plateau of Ouadda.

Summits
Summits in the Bongos include:
Mount Toussoro, 1368 meters

Geology
The lithology is dominated by rugged sandstone.

Miscellaneous
During November, December, and January, fires of several kilometres size advance down from the Chadian border.

References

Landforms of the Central African Republic
Mountain ranges
Mountain ranges of Africa